Shapcott is an English surname. Notable people with this surname include the following:

Jo Shapcott FRSL (born 1953), English poet, editor and lecturer
Michael Shapcott, Canadian social activist and academic
Morton Shapcott, English cricketer and Royal Air Force officer
Thomas Shapcott AO (born 1935), Australian poet, novelist, playwright, editor, librettist, short story writer and teacher

Other uses
Shapcott Wensley, pseudonym of English author and poet Henry Shapcott Bunce (1854–1917)

See also
Thomas Shapcott Poetry Prize, literary award for an unpublished poetry manuscript by a Queensland author

English-language surnames